Charles William Moore (3 June 1893 – 9 March 1966) was an English footballer who played as a full back for Manchester United. Born in Cheslyn Hay, Staffordshire, he played for Hednesford Town before joining United in May 1919. After two seasons, a recurring injury forced Moore to stop playing football, but in September 1922 he returned to play for United for a further eight years, making a total of 328 appearances for the club before retiring at the end of the 1929–1930 season. Moore never scored for United and never made an appearance for England, despite his reliability and consistency in his club's lineup.

Career statistics

References

1893 births
1966 deaths
English footballers
Association football fullbacks
Manchester United F.C. players
Hednesford Town F.C. players